Woodville was a small settlement in Russell County, Kansas, United States.

History
Woodville was issued a post office in 1878. The post office was discontinued in 1892.

References

Former populated places in Russell County, Kansas
Former populated places in Kansas